Steve or Steven Turner is the name of:

Sports 
 Steve Turner (rugby league) (born 1984), Australian rugby league footballer
 Steve Turner (Australian rules footballer) (born 1960), Australian rules footballer
 Steven Turner (born 1987), Canadian football player
 Steve Turner (tennis) (born 1946), American professional tennis player
 Steve Turner (NASCAR team owner), team owner of Turner Scott Motorsports

Others 
 Steve Turner (game programmer), game programmer and composer
 Steve Turner (guitarist) (born 1965), American musician
 Steve Turner (journalist) (1930s – 2016), British journalist and trade union leader
 Steve Turner (police commissioner) (born 1971), British police commissioner
 Steve Turner (trade unionist) (born 1962), British trade unionist
 Steve Turner (writer), British music journalist, biographer and poet

See also
Stephen Turner (disambiguation)